Debra Ann Livingston (born April 15, 1959) is an American lawyer who serves as the Chief United States circuit judge of the United States Court of Appeals for the Second Circuit.

Early life and education
Livingston was born in Waycross, Georgia, and received a Bachelor of Arts degree, magna cum laude, from the Woodrow Wilson School of Public and International Affairs at Princeton University in 1980 and a Juris Doctor, magna cum laude, from Harvard Law School in 1984, where she served as an editor of the Harvard Law Review.

Career
Livingston served as a law clerk for Judge J. Edward Lumbard of the United States Court of Appeals for the Second Circuit after graduating from law school. From 1986 to 1991, she was an assistant United States attorney in the Southern District of New York, where she handled criminal cases, including the prosecution of Ferdinand Marcos, former President of the Philippines. After working as a legal consultant to the United Nations High Commissioner for Refugees, Livingston was an associate at Paul, Weiss, Rifkind, Wharton & Garrison, a New York City law firm. From 1994 to 2003, she served as commissioner of the New York City Civilian Complaint Review Board. From 1992 to 1994, Livingston taught criminal procedure and evidence at the University of Michigan Law School. She joined the faculty of Columbia Law School in 1994, and continued to teach there as a Paul J. Kellner Professor of Law following her nomination to the bench. From 2005 to 2006, she served as the vice dean.

She is one of the authors of Comprehensive Criminal Procedure.

Federal judicial service
On June 28, 2006, Livingston was nominated by President George W. Bush to fill former Chief Judge John M. Walker, Jr.'s seat on the Second Circuit. That nomination was returned to the president when the 109th Congress adjourned. Bush renominated Livingston on January 9, 2007 to the 110th Congress. The Senate Judiciary Committee held a hearing on her nomination on April 11, 2007, and favorably reported her nomination on April 25, 2007. The Senate confirmed her nomination on May 9, 2007, by a 91–0 vote, almost one year after she was first nominated. She received her commission on May 17, 2007. She became chief judge on September 1, 2020.

Notable rulings
In December 2019, Livingston partially dissented from a federal appeals court ruling ordering that Donald Trump comply with a subpoena and turn over his tax returns to the U.S. House of Representatives. She stated, "I cannot accept the majority's conclusions that 'this case does not concern separation of powers,' and that there is 'minimal at best' risk of distraction to this and future Presidents from legislative subpoenas of this sort." Livingston said she would send the case back to a lower court and require the House committees to provide more details about the legislative purposes behind their requests before deciding whether the banks must comply.

References

External links

Resume posted by U.S. Department of Justice

1959 births
Living people
21st-century American judges
Assistant United States Attorneys
Columbia Law School faculty
Princeton University alumni
Harvard Law School alumni
Judges of the United States Court of Appeals for the Second Circuit
New York (state) lawyers
Paul, Weiss, Rifkind, Wharton & Garrison people
People from Waycross, Georgia
Princeton School of Public and International Affairs alumni
United States court of appeals judges appointed by George W. Bush
University of Michigan Law School faculty
American women legal scholars
21st-century American women judges